Rare-earth magnets are strong permanent magnets made from alloys of rare-earth elements. Developed in the 1970s and 1980s, rare-earth magnets are the strongest type of permanent magnets made, producing significantly stronger magnetic fields than other types such as ferrite or alnico magnets. The magnetic field typically produced by rare-earth magnets can exceed 1.2 teslas, whereas ferrite or ceramic magnets typically exhibit fields of 0.5 to 1 tesla.

There are two types: neodymium magnets and samarium–cobalt magnets.  Rare-earth magnets are extremely brittle and also vulnerable to corrosion, so they are usually plated or coated to protect them from breaking, chipping, or crumbling into powder.

The development of rare-earth magnets began around 1966, when  K. J. Strnat and G. Hoffer of the US Air Force Materials Laboratory discovered that an alloy of yttrium and cobalt, YCo5, had by far the largest magnetic anisotropy constant of any material then known.

The term "rare earth" can be misleading, as some of these metals can be as abundant in the Earth's crust as tin or lead, but rare earth ores do not exist in seams (like coal or copper), so in any given cubic kilometre of crust they are "rare". The major source is currently China. Some countries classify rare earth metals as strategically important,  and recent Chinese export restrictions on these materials have led some to initiate research programs to develop strong magnets that do not require rare earth metals.

Explanation of strength

The rare-earth (lanthanide) elements are metals that are ferromagnetic, meaning that like iron they can be magnetized to become permanent magnets, but their Curie temperatures (the temperature above which their ferromagnetism disappears) are below room temperature, so in pure form their magnetism only appears at low temperatures. However, they form compounds with the transition metals such as iron, nickel, and cobalt, and some of these compounds have Curie temperatures well above room temperature.  Rare-earth magnets are made from these compounds.

The greater strength of rare-earth magnets is mostly due to two factors:

First, their crystalline structures have very high magnetic anisotropy. This means that a crystal of the material preferentially magnetizes along a specific crystal axis but is very difficult to magnetize in other directions.   Like other magnets, rare-earth magnets are composed of microcrystalline grains, which are aligned in a powerful magnetic field during manufacture, so their magnetic axes all point in the same direction.  The resistance of the crystal lattice to turning its direction of magnetization gives these compounds a very high magnetic coercivity (resistance to being demagnetized), so that the strong demagnetizing field within the finished magnet does not reduce the material's magnetization.
Second, atoms of rare-earth elements can have high magnetic moments.  Their orbital electron structures contain many unpaired electrons; in other elements, almost all of the electrons exist in pairs with opposite spins, so their magnetic fields cancel out, but in rare-earths there is much less magnetic cancellation. This is a consequence of incomplete filling of the f-shell, which can contain up to 7 unpaired electrons.  In a magnet it is the unpaired electrons, aligned so they spin in the same direction, which generate the magnetic field. This gives the materials high remanence (saturation magnetization J). The maximal energy density B·H is proportional to J, so these materials have the potential for storing large amounts of magnetic energy. The magnetic energy product B·H of neodymium magnets is about 18 times greater than "ordinary" magnets by volume. This allows rare-earth magnets to be smaller than other magnets with the same field strength.

Magnetic properties

Some important properties used to compare permanent magnets are: remanence (Br), which measures the strength of the magnetic field; coercivity (Hci), the material's resistance to becoming demagnetized; energy product (B·Hmax), the density of magnetic energy; and Curie temperature (TC), the temperature at which the material loses its magnetism. Rare-earth magnets have higher remanence, much higher coercivity and energy product, but (for neodymium) lower Curie temperature than other types. The table below compares the magnetic performance of the two types of rare-earth magnets, neodymium (Nd2Fe14B) and samarium-cobalt (SmCo5), with other types of permanent magnets.

Source:

Types

Samarium-cobalt 

Samarium–cobalt magnets (chemical formula: SmCo5), the first family of rare-earth magnets invented, are less used than neodymium magnets because of their higher cost and lower magnetic field strength.  However, samarium–cobalt has a higher Curie temperature, creating a niche for these magnets in applications where high field strength is needed at high operating temperatures. They are highly resistant to oxidation, but sintered samarium–cobalt magnets are brittle and prone to chipping and cracking and may fracture when subjected to thermal shock.

Neodymium 

Neodymium magnets, invented in the 1980s, are the strongest and most affordable type of rare-earth magnet.  They are made of an alloy of neodymium, iron, and boron (Nd2Fe14B), sometimes abbreviated as NIB.   Neodymium magnets are used in numerous applications requiring strong, compact permanent magnets, such as electric motors for cordless tools, hard disk drives, magnetic holddowns, and jewelry clasps. They have the highest magnetic field strength and have a higher coercivity (which makes them magnetically stable), but they have a lower Curie temperature and are more vulnerable to oxidation than samarium–cobalt magnets.

Corrosion can cause unprotected magnets to spall off a surface layer or to crumble into a powder.  Use of protective surface treatments such as gold, nickel, zinc, and tin plating and epoxy-resin coating can provide corrosion protection; the majority of neodymium magnets use nickel plating to provide a robust protection.

Originally, the high cost of these magnets limited their use to applications requiring compactness together with high field strength.  Both the raw materials and the patent licenses were expensive.  However, since the 1990s, NIB magnets have become steadily less expensive, and their lower cost has inspired new uses such as magnetic construction toys.

Hazards 
The greater force exerted by rare-earth magnets creates hazards that are not seen with other types of magnet.  Magnets larger than a few centimeters are strong enough to cause injuries to body parts pinched between two magnets or a magnet and a metal surface, even causing broken bones.  Magnets allowed to get too near each other can strike each other with enough force to chip and shatter the brittle material, and the flying chips can cause injuries.  Starting in 2005, powerful magnets breaking off toys or from magnetic construction sets started causing injuries and deaths. Young children who have swallowed several magnets have had a fold of the digestive tract pinched between the magnets, causing injury and in one case intestinal perforations, sepsis, and death.

A voluntary standard for toys, permanently fusing strong magnets to prevent swallowing, and capping unconnected magnet strength, was adopted in 2007. In 2009, a sudden growth in sales of magnetic desk toys for adults caused a surge in injuries, with emergency room visits estimated at 3,617 in 2012. In response, the U.S. Consumer Product Safety Commission passed a rule in 2012 restricting rare-earth magnet size in consumer products, but it was vacated by a US federal court decision in November 2016, in a case brought by the one remaining manufacturer. After the rule was nullified, the number of ingestion incidents in the country rose sharply, and is estimated to exceed 1,500 in 2019.

Applications 
Since their prices became competitive in the 1990s, neodymium magnets have been replacing alnico and ferrite magnets in the many applications in modern technology requiring powerful magnets.  Their greater strength allows smaller and lighter magnets to be used for a given application.

Common applications 

Common applications of rare-earth magnets include:
 computer hard disk drives
 wind turbine generators
  speakers / headphones
 bicycle dynamos 
 MRI scanners
 fishing reel brakes
 permanent magnet motors in cordless tools
 high-performance AC servo motors
 traction motors and integrated starter-generators in hybrid and electric vehicles
 mechanically powered flashlights, employing rare earth magnets for generating electricity in a shaking motion or rotating (hand-crank-powered) motion
 industrial uses such as maintaining product purity, equipment protection, and quality control
 capture of fine metallic particles in lubricating oils (crankcases of internal combustion engines, also gearboxes and differentials), so as to keep said particles out of circulation, thereby rendering them unable to cause abrasive wear of moving machine parts

Other applications 
Other applications of rare-earth magnets include:
Linear motors (used in maglev trains, etc.)
Stop motion animation: as tie-downs when the use of traditional screw and nut tie-downs is impractical.
Diamagnetic levitation experimentation, the study of magnetic field dynamics and superconductor levitation.
Electrodynamic bearings
Launched roller coaster technology found on roller coaster and other thrill rides.
LED Throwies, small LEDs attached to a button cell battery and a small rare earth magnet, used as a form of non-destructive graffiti and temporary public art.
Neodymium magnet toys
Electric guitar pickups
Miniature figures, for which rare-earth magnets have gained popularity in the miniatures gaming community for their small size and relative strength assisting in basing and swapping weapons between models.

Rare-earth-free permanent magnets
The United States Department of Energy has identified a need to find substitutes for rare-earth metals in permanent-magnet technology and has begun funding such research. The Advanced Research Projects Agency-Energy (ARPA-E) has sponsored a Rare Earth Alternatives in Critical Technologies (REACT) program, to develop alternative materials. In 2011, ARPA-E awarded 31.6 million dollars to fund Rare-Earth Substitute projects.

Recycling efforts
The European Union's ETN-Demeter project (European Training Network for the Design and Recycling of Rare-Earth Permanent Magnet Motors and Generators in Hybrid and Full Electric Vehicles) is examining sustainable design of electric motors used in vehicles. They are, for example, designing electric motors in which the magnets can be easily removed for recycling the rare earth metals.

The European Union's European Research Council also awarded to Principal Investigator, Prof. Thomas Zemb, and co-Principal Investigator, Dr. Jean-Christophe P. Gabriel, an Advanced Research Grant for the project "Rare Earth Element reCYCling with Low harmful Emissions : REE-CYCLE", which aimed at finding new processes for the recycling of rare earth.

See also

References

Further reading
 Furlani Edward P. (2001). "Permanent Magnet and Electromechanical Devices: Materials, Analysis and Applications". Academic Press Series in Electromagnetism. .
 Campbell Peter (1996). "Permanent Magnet Materials and their Application" (Cambridge Studies in Magnetism). .

External links
Standard Specifications for Permanent Magnet Materials (Magnetic Materials Producers Association)

Ferromagnetic materials
Loudspeaker technology
Magnetic levitation
Types of magnets